Whites Creek is a stream in Carter and Oregon counties in the Ozarks of southern Missouri. It is a tributary of the Eleven Point River.

Whites Creek has the name of the local White family.

See also
List of rivers of Missouri

References

Rivers of Carter County, Missouri
Rivers of Oregon County, Missouri
Rivers of Missouri